JGE may refer to:

 JGE: The Journal of General Education
 Journal of Geophysics and Engineering
 Jumpgate Evolution
 Jumeirah Golf Estates